Tamugheh Rural District is a rural district (dehestan) in the Central District of Saqqez County, Kurdistan Province, Iran. At the 2006 census, its population was 8,890, in 1,810 families. The rural district has 17 villages.

References 

Rural Districts of Kurdistan Province
Saqqez County